In aeronautics, the aspect ratio of a wing is the ratio of its span to its mean chord. It is equal to the square of the wingspan divided by the wing area. Thus, a long, narrow wing has a high aspect ratio, whereas a short, wide wing has a low aspect ratio.

Aspect ratio and other features of the planform are often used to predict the aerodynamic efficiency of a wing because the lift-to-drag ratio increases with aspect ratio, improving the fuel economy in powered airplanes and the gliding angle of sailplanes.

Definition 
The aspect ratio  is the ratio of the square of the wingspan  to the projected wing area , which is equal to the ratio of the wingspan  to the standard mean chord :

Mechanism 
As a useful simplification, an airplane in flight can be imagined to affect a circular cylinder of air with a diameter equal to the wingspan. A large wingspan affects a large cylinder of air, and a small wingspan affects a small cylinder of air. A small air cylinder must be pushed down with a greater power (energy change per unit time) than a large cylinder in order to produce an equal upward force (momentum change per unit time). This is because giving the same momentum change to a smaller mass of air requires giving it a greater velocity change, and a much greater energy change because energy is proportional to the square of the velocity while momentum is only linearly proportional to the velocity. The aft-leaning component of this change in velocity is proportional to the induced drag, which is the force needed to take up that power at that airspeed.

The interaction between undisturbed air outside the cylinder of air, and the downward-moving cylinder of air occurs at the wingtips and can be seen as wingtip vortices.

It is important to keep in mind that this is a drastic oversimplification, and an airplane wing affects a very large area around itself.

In aircraft

Although a long, narrow wing with a high aspect ratio has aerodynamic advantages like better lift-to-drag-ratio (see also details below), there are several reasons why not all aircraft have high aspect-ratio wings:

 Structural: A long wing has higher bending stress for a given load than a short one and therefore requires higher structural-design (architectural and/or material) specifications.  Also, longer wings may have some torsion for a given load, and in some applications this torsion is undesirable (e.g. if the warped wing interferes with aileron effect).
 Maneuverability: a low aspect-ratio wing will have a higher roll angular acceleration than one with high aspect ratio, because a high aspect-ratio wing has a higher moment of inertia to overcome. In a steady roll, the longer wing gives a higher roll moment because of the longer moment arm of the aileron. Low aspect-ratio wings are usually used on fighter aircraft, not only for the higher roll rates, but especially for longer chord and thinner airfoils involved in supersonic flight.
 Parasitic drag:  While high aspect wings create less induced drag, they have greater parasitic drag (drag due to shape, frontal area, and surface friction).  This is because, for an equal wing area, the average chord (length in the direction of wind travel over the wing) is smaller.  Due to the effects of Reynolds number, the value of the section drag coefficient is an inverse logarithmic function of the characteristic length of the surface, which means that, even if two wings of the same area are flying at equal speeds and equal angles of attack, the section drag coefficient is slightly higher on the wing with the smaller chord.  However, this variation is very small when compared to the variation in induced drag with changing wingspan.For example, the section drag coefficient  of a NACA 23012 airfoil (at typical lift coefficients) is inversely proportional to chord length to the power 0.129:   
A 20% increase in chord length would decrease the section drag coefficient by 2.38%.
 Practicality:  low aspect ratios have a greater useful internal volume, since the maximum thickness is greater, which can be used to house the fuel tanks, retractable landing gear and other systems.
 Airfield size: Airfields, hangars, and other ground equipment define a maximum wingspan, which cannot be exceeded. To generate enough lift at a given wingspan, the aircraft designer must increase wing area by lengthening the chord, thus lowering the aspect ratio. This limits the Airbus A380 to 80m wide with an aspect ratio of 7.8, while the Boeing 787 or Airbus A350 have an aspect ratio of 9.5, influencing flight economy.

Variable aspect ratio

Aircraft which approach or exceed the speed of sound sometimes incorporate variable-sweep wings. These wings give a high aspect ratio when unswept and a low aspect ratio at maximum sweep.

In subsonic flow, steeply swept and narrow wings are inefficient compared to a high-aspect-ratio wing. However, as the flow becomes transonic and then supersonic, the shock wave first generated along the wing's upper surface causes wave drag on the aircraft, and this drag is proportional to the span of the wing. Thus a long span, valuable at low speeds, causes excessive drag at transonic and supersonic speeds.

By varying the sweep the wing can be optimised for the current flight speed. However, the extra weight and complexity of a moveable wing mean that such a system is not included in many designs.

Birds and bats

The aspect ratios of birds' and bats' wings vary considerably.  Birds that fly long distances or spend long periods soaring such as albatrosses and eagles often have wings of high aspect ratio. By contrast, birds which require good maneuverability, such as the Eurasian sparrowhawk, have wings of low aspect ratio.

Details
For a constant-chord wing of chord c and span b, the aspect ratio is given by:

If the wing is swept, c is measured parallel to the direction of forward flight.

For most wings the length of the chord is not a constant but varies along the wing, so the aspect ratio AR is defined as the square of the wingspan b divided by the wing area S. In symbols,
.

For such a wing with varying chord, the standard mean chord SMC is defined as 

The performance of aspect ratio AR  related to the lift-to-drag-ratio and wingtip vortices is illustrated in the formula used to calculate the drag coefficient of an aircraft 

where
{| border="0"
|-
|            || is the aircraft drag coefficient
|-
|    || is the aircraft zero-lift drag coefficient,
|-
|            || is the aircraft lift coefficient,
|-
|            || is the circumference-to-diameter ratio of a circle, pi,
|- 
|              || is the Oswald efficiency number
|-
|        || is the aspect ratio.
|}

Wetted aspect ratio
The wetted aspect ratio considers the whole wetted surface area of the airframe, rather than just the wing. It is a better measure of the aerodynamic efficiency of an aircraft than the wing aspect ratio. It is defined as:

Illustrative examples are provided by the Boeing B-47 and Avro Vulcan. Both aircraft have very similar performance although they are radically different. The B-47 has a high aspect ratio wing, while the Avro Vulcan has a low aspect ratio wing. They have, however, a very similar wetted aspect ratio.

See also
Centerboard
Wing configuration

Notes

References
 Anderson, John D. Jr, Introduction to Flight, 5th edition, McGraw-Hill. New York, NY. 
 Anderson, John D. Jr, Fundamentals of Aerodynamics, Section 5.3 (4th edition), McGraw-Hill. New York, NY. 
 L. J. Clancy (1975), Aerodynamics, Pitman Publishing Limited, London 
 John P. Fielding. Introduction to Aircraft Design, Cambridge University Press, 
 Daniel P. Raymer (1989). Aircraft Design: A Conceptual Approach, American Institute of Aeronautics and Astronautics, Inc., Washington, DC. 
 McLean, Doug, Understanding Aerodynamics: Arguing from the Real Physics, Section 3.3.5 (1st Edition), Wiley. 

Engineering ratios
Aircraft wing design
Wing configurations